Hoàng Trung Hải (born September 27, 1959, in Thái Bình Province) is a Vietnamese Politician and the Communist Secretary of the Party Committee in Ha Noi City, a post he began to take from 5 February 2016. He is a member of the 12th Politburo Committee. He was the Deputy Prime Minister of Vietnam from 27 August 2007 to 5 February 2016. Before taking this post, he had been the Minister of Industry of Vietnam. Hoàng Trung Hải graduated from Hanoi University of Technology with a degree in power systems. He also gained an MBA from Trinity College Dublin, Ireland. On February 7, 2020, he was transferred to the Post of a deputy director of the Document Drafting Subcommittee of the 13th Congress of the Communist Party of Vietnam.

References

Living people
1959 births
Government ministers of Vietnam
Members of the 12th Politburo of the Communist Party of Vietnam
Members of the 9th Central Committee of the Communist Party of Vietnam
Members of the 10th Central Committee of the Communist Party of Vietnam
Members of the 11th Central Committee of the Communist Party of Vietnam
Members of the 12th Central Committee of the Communist Party of Vietnam
Members of the 13th Central Committee of the Communist Party of Vietnam
Deputy Prime Ministers of Vietnam
People from Thái Bình province